Ryan Patrick Day is an American football coach and former college football player. He is the 24th and current head football coach at Ohio State University, a position he has held since 2019. Day was also the acting head coach for the Ohio State Buckeyes for the first three games of the 2018 season. He attended the University of New Hampshire, where he played quarterback and linebacker for the Wildcats from 1998 to 2001 before he began his coaching career in 2002.

Playing career
Day attended Manchester Central High School in Manchester, New Hampshire. As a quarterback and defensive back, he was the state's Gatorade Player of the Year for his senior season.
Day attended the University of New Hampshire. Playing for then-offensive coordinator Chip Kelly, Day set four career records at UNH, including completion percentage and touchdowns.

Coaching career

Early career
Day was the offensive coordinator for Temple in 2012, as well as the offensive coordinator for Boston College from 2013 to 2014. He was hired as the Philadelphia Eagles' quarterbacks coach on January 22, 2015. Then, in 2016, after his mentor Chip Kelly was relieved of his duties in Philadelphia, Day was hired in the same role by Kelly, who became the head coach of the San Francisco 49ers. On January 3, 2017, Day was hired to replace co-offensive coordinator Tim Beck of the Ohio State Buckeyes. After being linked to the Tennessee Titans offensive coordinator position in January 2018, Day was promoted to offensive coordinator and primary play caller at Ohio State.

Ohio State

2018 season
On August 1, 2018, Day was named acting head coach at Ohio State when head coach Urban Meyer was placed on administrative leave when news came to light of Meyer's knowledge of events surrounding then-fired Zach Smith's domestic violence accusations made by Smith's estranged wife. Day won all three games during Meyer's absence. On December 4, 2018, Ohio State announced that Meyer would retire as head coach after the 2019 Rose Bowl and be replaced by Day on a full-time basis.

2019 season

In 2019, Day's first season as a full-time head coach, he led the Buckeyes to a perfect 12-0 regular season record, the Buckeyes' first undefeated regular season since 2013. Despite being predicted to finish second in the Big Ten East Division according to the 2019 Cleveland.com preseason poll, the Buckeyes clinched the division following their November 23 victory over Penn State, and secured a spot in the Big Ten Championship, which they would go on to win beat Wisconsin 34-21. The Buckeyes were named the number two seed in the College Football Playoff and lost to the Clemson Tigers in the Fiesta Bowl. On December 3, 2019, Coach Day was named the Dave McClain Coach of the Year by the media.

2020 season
Day's second season was significantly shortened due to the Big Ten Conference's policies regarding the COVID-19 pandemic. The Buckeyes' regular season was shortened from 12 games to 8 games, and then down to 5 because of cancellations due to the pandemic. After starting the season 4-0, Coach Day was forced to miss the December 5 game against Michigan State after testing positive for COVID-19, which the Buckeyes won, 52–12. What would have been Ohio State's sixth regular season game, against rival Michigan, was cancelled due to COVID-19 concerns within the Michigan program. This was the first time since the 1917 season that Ohio State and Michigan did not play each other. The Big Ten's coronavirus policies would have prevented the Buckeyes from playing in the 2020 Big Ten Football Championship Game, as they did not meet the six-game threshold put forth by the conference. However, on December 9, 2020, the Big Ten administrative council voted to remove the six game minimum, allowing Ohio State to advance to the conference championship. The Buckeyes played in the Big Ten Championship game on December 19, where they beat the Northwestern Wildcats 22-10. Ohio State was selected as the number 3 seed in the College Football Playoff, where they faced number 2 Clemson in the 2021 Sugar Bowl. Ohio State defeated Clemson 49-28, and advanced to the 2021 College Football Playoff National Championship, to face number 1 Alabama. The Buckeyes lost to Alabama 52-24.

2021 season
The 2021 season, Day's third full season as head coach, began with the Buckeyes ranked fourth in both the AP and Coaches' Poll. After an early season upset by Oregon, Day led Ohio State through a nine-game win streak behind Heisman finalist C. J. Stroud. Ohio State had wins against then 20th-ranked Penn State and fifth-ranked Michigan State. Going into the Michigan game, Ohio State was ranked No. 2 and Michigan was ranked No. 5 by the College Football Playoff committee. Michigan defeated Ohio State for the first time since 2011. Though technically Ohio State and Michigan tied for the division championship, despite the loss, Michigan earned the right to represent the Big Ten East in the Conference Championship game. As a result, this loss effectively eliminated Ohio State from  playoff contention. Ohio State was selected to play against Utah in the Rose Bowl. Ohio State won the Rose Bowl, 48–45.

2022 season 
The 2022 season, which was Day's fourth full season at the helm, featured the Buckeyes starting ranked #2 in the nation in both the AP and Coaches' Poll. With returning quarterback CJ Stroud, Ohio State managed to start 8-0, with double digit wins at home over a then-top 5 Notre Dame and away at the #13 ranked Penn State Nittany Lions. In the inaugural College Football Playoff rankings of the season, the Buckeyes landed at #2, a spot they would hold for four weeks. Though they struggled in games against a 1-7 Northwestern and a 6-4 Maryland, Ohio State managed to remain undefeated heading into the matchup against #3 Michigan for the series' second matchup of 11-0 teams (the first since 2006), and the third meeting between top-5 teams since they met in 2016. Despite being favored by eight points, Ohio State was utterly embarrassed 45-23, and managed to score only three points in the second half. With this loss, Ohio State failed to reach the Big Ten Championship for the second consecutive season, and Ryan Day fell to 1-2 against the Wolverines, becoming the first Ohio State head coach to lose multiple games to Michigan in the 21st century. Day is also 0-2 since infamously stating that he would "hang 100 on them." Despite the loss to the Wolverines, the Buckeyes made the College Football Playoff as the 4-seed. In the College Football Playoff Semifinal at the Chick-fil-A Peach Bowl, Day and Buckeyes fell to the eventual National Champion Georgia Bulldogs 42–41.

Personal life
Day was born and raised in Manchester, New Hampshire, and met his wife, Christina Ourania Spirou, whom he calls Nina, when they played together on the same tee ball team when she was seven and he was six. Married in June 2005, the Days have three children.

Day was raised by a single mother, Lisa Day, following the death of his father, Raymond Day, on January 20, 1988, of suicide. On June 5, 2019, Day admitted publicly, for the first time, his father was a victim of suicide, when he was nine years old, with two younger brothers, Chris, seven, and Tim, five .

In the same interview , Day shared with the reporter his journey from anger and jealousy as a small boy, to one of an adult who understands, now, the profound effect mental illness can have on not just the individual, but also the family. More than anything, he wanted to help remove the stigma attached to suffering from, and openly talking about, mental illness in today's youth. Because of this, since becoming head coach at Ohio State, Day and his wife have chosen to partner with an organization focused on lifting that stigma, On Our Sleeves, a movement begun at the Nationwide Children's Hospital. An extension of this partnership is The Christina and Ryan Day Fund for Pediatric and Adolescent Mental Wellness, which the Days donated $100,000 to initiate the fund.

Head coaching record

Notes

References

External links
 Ohio State profile
 Coaching statistics at Sports-Reference.com

1979 births
Living people
American football quarterbacks
Boston College Eagles football coaches
Florida Gators football coaches
New Hampshire Wildcats football coaches
New Hampshire Wildcats football players
Philadelphia Eagles coaches
Ohio State Buckeyes football coaches
San Francisco 49ers coaches
Temple Owls football coaches
Manchester Central High School alumni
Sportspeople from Manchester, New Hampshire
Coaches of American football from New Hampshire
Players of American football from New Hampshire